Simon Curtis (born 11 March 1960) is an English director and producer. He has directed theatre productions and the television dramas David Copperfield (1999) and Cranford (2007, 2009). His feature films include the biographical dramas My Week with Marilyn (2011),  Woman in Gold (2015), and Downton Abbey: A New Era (2022).

Career
Curtis began his career working at the Royal Court Theatre. His first job was assistant director for Caryl Churchill's Top Girls. He later became assistant director to both Danny Boyle and Max Stafford-Clark. Theatre productions Curtis has worked on include the world premiere of Road, A Lie of the Mind, Roots, Dinner with Friends and The Rise and Fall of Little Voice. In 2010, Curtis directed Serenading Louie at the Donmar Warehouse.

In 1996, Curtis directed episodes of the television comedy series Tracey Takes On... for HBO. He also directed the three-part television drama Twenty Thousand Streets Under the Sky for BBC Four in 2005. The serial is an adaptation of Patrick Hamilton's 20,000 Streets Under the Sky novels.

He directed the BBC's adaptation of Elizabeth Gaskell's Cranford in 2007. In June 2009, Curtis directed two new episodes of Cranford for the Christmas period. Titled Return to Cranford, the episodes were aired from 20 December 2009.

In August 2008, Curtis directed the one-off television drama A Short Stay in Switzerland for the BBC. The drama, featuring Julie Walters, was based on the true story of Dr. Anne Turner, who decided to take her own life at a Dignitas clinic in 2006. A Short Stay in Switzerland was nominated for Best Single Drama at the Royal Television Society Awards and the British Academy Television Awards.

In 2004, Curtis approached producer David Parfitt about making a film based on The Prince, The Showgirl and Me and My Week with Marilyn; two diary accounts written by Colin Clark about his time with Marilyn Monroe. Adrian Hodges wrote and adapted the screenplay for the film called My Week with Marilyn. Curtis and Parfitt went to BBC Films and the UK Film Council and they put up the money for development. Curtis then approached Harvey Weinstein who financed the film. My Week with Marilyn was filmed in late 2010 and released in November 2011.

In 2015, Curtis directed and executive produced the biographical film Woman in Gold, starring Helen Mirren as Maria Altmann, a Holocaust survivor attempting to recover a portrait of her aunt painted by Gustav Klimt which was stolen from her family by the Nazis and had eventually become property of the government of Austria, and closely connected to Austrian identity. Curtis' wife Elizabeth McGovern has a small role as a court judge in the film.

Curtis directed the 2019 feature film adaptation of Garth Stein's The Art of Racing in the Rain, starring Milo Ventimiglia and Amanda Seyfried.

In April 2021, it was announced Curtis would direct Downton Abbey: A New Era, the upcoming sequel to the first film and television series of the same name.

Personal life
Curtis was born in London, England. He married American actress Elizabeth McGovern in 1992. The couple have two daughters and live in Chiswick, London.

Filmography

Film

Television

References

External links
 
 

British film producers
Living people
1960 births
Film directors from London